The 2013 ATP Vegeta Croatia Open Umag was a men's tennis tournament played on outdoor clay courts. It was the 24th edition of the ATP Vegeta Croatia Open Umag, and was part of the ATP World Tour 250 Series of the 2013 ATP World Tour. It took place at the International Tennis Center in Umag, Croatia, from 18 July until 28 July 2013. Fifth-seeded Tommy Robredo won the singles title.

Singles main draw entrants

Seeds 

 1 Rankings are as of July 15, 2013

Other entrants 
The following players received wildcards into the singles main draw:
  Borna Ćorić
  Mate Pavić
  Antonio Veić

The following players received entry from the qualifying draw:
  Blaž Kavčič
  Dušan Lajović
  Joško Topić
  Boy Westerhof

Withdrawals
Before the tournament
  Marin Čilić (knee injury)
  Pablo Cuevas
  Jerzy Janowicz (right arm injury)
  Fernando Verdasco (hand injury)

Retirements
  Andreas Haider-Maurer (lower back strain)
  Horacio Zeballos (intercostal muscle pain)

Doubles main draw entrants

Seeds 

 Rankings are as of July 15, 2013

Other entrants 
The following pairs received wildcards into the doubles main draw:
  Borna Ćorić /  Nikola Mektić
  Franko Škugor /  Antonio Veić
The following pair received entry as alternates:
  Aljaž Bedene /  Dušan Lajović

Withdrawals
Before the tournament
  Fabio Fognini (fatigue)
During the tournament
  Viktor Troicki (personal reasons)
  Horacio Zeballos (intercostal muscle pain)

Finals

Singles 

  Tommy Robredo defeated  Fabio Fognini, 6–0, 6–3

Doubles 

  Martin Kližan /  David Marrero defeated  Nicholas Monroe /  Simon Stadler, 6–1, 5–7, [10–7]

References

External links 
 

ATP Studena Croatia Open
2013
2013 in Croatian tennis